Bonkowski's slender gecko (Hemiphyllodactylus bonkowskii) is a species of gecko. It is endemic to Vietnam.

References

Hemiphyllodactylus
Reptiles described in 2020
Endemic fauna of Vietnam
Reptiles of Vietnam